John Duke Coleridge, 1st Baron Coleridge, PC (3 December 1820 – 14 June 1894) was an English lawyer, judge and Liberal politician. He held the posts, in turn, of Solicitor General for England and Wales, Attorney General for England and Wales, Chief Justice of the Common Pleas and Lord Chief Justice of England.

Background and education
Coleridge was the eldest son of John Taylor Coleridge, and the great-nephew of the poet Samuel Taylor Coleridge. He was educated at Eton and Balliol College, Oxford, and was called to the bar in 1846.

Coleridge was a member of the Canterbury Association from 24 June 1851.

Legal career
Coleridge established a successful legal practice on the western circuit. From 1853 to 1854 he held the post of secretary to the Royal Commission on the City of London. In 1865 he was elected to the House of Commons for Exeter for the Liberal Party. He made a favourable impression on the leaders of his party and when the Liberals came to office in 1868 under William Ewart Gladstone, Coleridge was appointed Solicitor-General. In 1871 he was promoted to Attorney-General, a post he held until 1873. In 1871 he was also involved in the high-publicity Tichborne Case. In 1873 he was described by the Manchester-based Women's Suffrage Journal as a "firm and consistent" supporter of women's suffrage.

In November 1873 Coleridge succeeded Sir William Bovill as Chief Justice of the Common Pleas, and in January 1874 was raised to the peerage as Baron Coleridge, of Ottery St Mary in the County of Devon.

In 1875, the three English common law courts (the Court of Queen's Bench, the Court of Common Pleas, and the Court of the Exchequer) merged to become divisions of the new High Court of Justice. The head of each court (Lord Chief Justice Sir Alexander Cockburn, Chief Justice of the Common Pleas Lord Coleridge, and Chief Baron of the Exchequer Sir Fitzroy Kelly) continued in post. After the deaths of Kelly and Cockburn in 1880, the three divisions were merged into a single division, with Lord Coleridge as Lord Chief Justice of England. In 1884, he was elected as a member of the American Philosophical Society. Despite his health failing towards the end of his life he remained in this office until his death on 14 June 1894, aged 74.

Family
On 11 August 1846, Coleridge married Jane Fortescue Seymour, daughter of the Rev. George Turner Seymour of Freshwater, Isle of Wight, herself an accomplished artist who notably painted John Henry Newman. They had three sons and a daughter:
 Mildred Mary Coleridge (1847–1929), married Charles Warren Adams
 Bernard John Seymour Coleridge (1851–1927), Liberal MP and judge of the High Court, succeeded as 2nd Baron Coleridge
 Stephen William Buchanan Coleridge (1854–1936), barrister, author and landscape artist
 Gilbert James Duke Coleridge (1859–1953), barrister and sculptor

His first wife died on 6 February 1878. He remained a widower until 13 August 1885, when he married Amy Augusta Jackson Lawford, daughter of Henry Baring Lawford, who survived him.

When Coleridge's daughter Mildred went to live with the lawyer Charles Warren Adams – they married in 1885, Lord Coleridge refusing to attend the wedding – the family considered the match inappropriate. Mildred's brother Bernard wrote her a letter disparaging Adams as a fortune hunter, which prompted Adams to sue for libel. The resultant legal proceedings in November 1884 and November 1886 were highly embarrassing for Lord Coleridge, who was obliged as Lord Chief Justice to appear in the court of which he was the senior judge.

Leading cases and judgements
R v Coney (1882)
R v Dudley and Stephens (1884)
Gordon-Cumming v Wilson and Others (1891), the trial arising from the Royal Baccarat Scandal.

Arms

References

A short notice of her by Dean Church of St Paul's was published in The Guardian, and was reprinted in her husband's privately printed collection of poems.

External links

 

1820 births
1894 deaths
Barons in the Peerage of the United Kingdom
Chief Justices of the Common Pleas
John
People educated at Eton College
Liberal Party (UK) MPs for English constituencies
Lord chief justices of England and Wales
Attorneys General for England and Wales
Solicitors General for England and Wales
UK MPs 1865–1868
UK MPs 1868–1874
UK MPs who were granted peerages
Fellows of the Royal Society
Members of the Canterbury Association
Alumni of Balliol College, Oxford
Knights Bachelor
Members of the Privy Council of the United Kingdom
Presidents of the Oxford Union
Members of the Parliament of the United Kingdom for Exeter
Peers of the United Kingdom created by Queen Victoria
Members of the American Philosophical Society